The Mistaya River is a short river in western Alberta, Canada. It flows through the Canadian Rockies, and a section of the Icefields Parkway was built along its course.

Mistaya River originates in Peyto Lake, a glacial lake of typical blue colour (due to rock flour). Mistaya flows north-west, receiving the waters of creeks such as Delta, Silverhorn, Cirque, Noyes, Chephren, Totem, Epaulette, Bison, Kaufmann and Sarbach. A series of elongated lakes are formed along the river: Mistaya Lake and Waterfowl Lakes.

Mistaya merges into the North Saskatchewan River at Saskatchewan River Crossing.

From its headwaters of Peyto Creek, Mistaya River has a total length of 38 km.

The origin of the name is from the Cree language:  means "grizzly bear".

See also 
 List of rivers of Alberta

References

Rivers of Alberta
Banff National Park
North Saskatchewan River